This Man Is Dangerous is a 1936 thriller novel by the British writer Peter Cheyney. It is the first in his series of ten novels featuring the FBI agent Lemmy Caution. A bestseller, it enabled Cheyney to leave his job as a policeman and become a full-time novelist.

Adaptation
In 1953 it was made into a French film of the same title directed by Jean Sacha and starring Eddie Constantine as Caution along with Colette Deréal, Grégoire Aslan and Claude Borelli.

References

Bibliography
 Goble, Alan. The Complete Index to Literary Sources in Film. Walter de Gruyter, 1999.
 Ward, Alfred Charles & Hussey, Maurice . Longman Companion to Twentieth Century Literature. Longman, 1981.

1936 British novels
Novels by Peter Cheyney
British thriller novels
British novels adapted into films
William Collins, Sons books